Darío Rodríguez may refer to:

 Darío Rodríguez (Uruguayan footballer) (born 1974), Uruguayan football centre-back
 Darío Rodríguez (Colombian footballer) (born 1995), Colombian football forward